The 1979 Michigan State Spartans football team represented Michigan State University in the 1979 Big Ten Conference football season. In their fourth season under head coach Darryl Rogers, the Spartans compiled a 5–6 overall record (3–5 against Big Ten opponents) and finished in a tie for sixth place in the Big Ten Conference.

Three Spartans were selected by either the Associated Press (AP) or the United Press International (UPI) as first-team players on the 1979 All-Big Ten Conference football teams: tight end Mark Brammer (UPI-1); linebacker Danny Bass (AP-1); and punter Ray Stachowitz (AP-1).

Following the season, Rogers departed East Lansing to assume the same position at Arizona State. Ironically, the man Rogers replaced in Tempe, Frank Kush, was an All-America lineman for the Spartans under Biggie Munn in 1952.

Schedule

Roster

References

Michigan State
Michigan State Spartans football seasons
Michigan State Spartans football